The 2011 Autobacs Super GT Series was the nineteenth season of the Japan Automobile Federation Super GT Championship including the All Japan Grand Touring Car Championship (JGTC) era and the seventh season as the Super GT series. It also marked the twenty-ninth season of a JAF-sanctioned sports car racing championship dating back to the All Japan Sports Prototype Championship. It is a series for Grand Touring race cars divided into two categories: GT500 and GT300. The season began on May 1 and ended on November 13, 2011 after 8 races and 1 non-championship race. The season was due to start on April 2, but the 2011 Tōhoku earthquake and tsunami caused its postponement.

In the GT500 class, MOLA won the championship in their first ever season in the GT500 class. The MOLA drivers also scored some notable achievements with this title victory: Masataka Yanagida, who had won the GT300 title in 2003 and 2010, becomes the first (and so far only) driver to win both the GT500 and the GT300 class, while Ronnie Quintarelli would win his first out of four GT500 titles in this season. In the GT300 class, Goodsmile Racing & Studie shocked everyone by winning the championship with the Hatsune Miku itasha-liveried BMW Z4 GT3, giving series veteran Nobuteru Taniguchi and Taku Bamba their first title in this series. It also marked the first championship title for FIA GT3-specification cars in this series.

Schedule

The provisional calendar was released on 8 August 2010. The Autopolis round which was absent the previous season was added to the calendar while the Suzuka race was reduced to a 700 km Endurance race only. Like the previous season, the non-Super GT pointed race JAF Grand Prix was to be raced as a conclusion to the season.

However, due to the 2011 Tōhoku earthquake and tsunami on March 11, a large part of the season was modified to cope with the situation.

The calendar was updated on 15 April 2011.

Impact of Tōhoku earthquake and tsunami
As a response of the 2011 Tōhoku earthquake and tsunami, the racing calendar and regulations were given a lot of modifications as a response to the national policy of energy conservation.
The Okayama GT event, originally to be held on April 2 was postponed to 22 May despite damage to the Okayama International Circuit being minimal. The GT Association would still consider it as the 1st Round. The postponement of the Fuji Round was put under consideration as well.
All race distances will be trimmed from 300 km to 250 km, other than the first Fuji race will change from 500 km to 300 km, and the Suzuka round from 700 km to 500 km. In addition, the Suzuka round will be only run in day sessions.
Pitworks at nights are limited to a shorter period of time. Overnight works are not allowed between qualifying and the race.

Drivers and teams

GT500

GT300

Team Movements

GT500
Honda
The original driver lineup from the ARTA, Ralph Firman and Yuji Ide, both left the team this season. They were replaced by Hideki Mutoh and Takashi Kobayashi respectively.
Lexus
Racing Project Bandoh, GT300 Class Champion in 2009 season, will be participating in GT500 class this year.
Björn Wirdheim who drove in the ENEOS last season, moved to Nissan's Kondō Racing.
Lexus will using SC430 until season ends, as there are remaining SC430s in the factory. The SC430 will be replaced by the LFA in the next season.
Nissan 
MOLA, GT300 Class Champion in the 2008 season, will be participating in GT500 class this year. With Masataka Yanagida and Ronnie Quintarelli as their drivers, while João Paulo de Oliveira who was with Kondō Racing filled the void in the Impul team.

GT300
RE Amemiya, a regular GT300 entrant in the class since the 1995 JGTC season, has withdrawn from the series completely. While 2008 and 2009 GT300 Champion Team MOLA and Racing Project Bandoh both moved up to the GT500 class respectively. 2010 GT300 Champion Hasemi Motorsport also withdrawn the series in early April. Making both Nissan and Mazda car absent in the GT300 lineup this year, for the first time since 1995.
Jim Gainer Team, which was using the Ferrari F430 in the 2010 season, switched 1 of their 2 cars to a Ferrari F458 GTC. Ferrari stated they are not likely to supply F458's to any of the Super GT teams. Team Mach also showed interest in using an F458 this season but due to the reason above, the plan was not implemented and they had to drive with a Vemac.
Studie, which used a BMW Z4 (E86) in the 2008 and 2009 seasons, returned to the series with a BMW Z4 GT3, previously the #76 car used by Schubert Motorsport (Team Need for Speed) in the 2010 FIA GT3 European Championship season. They have hired former F1 driver Ukyo Katayama as their sporting director and former RE Amemiya driver Nobuteru Taniguchi as their driver.
Team COX left the series after just one season in the series. Goodsmile Racing would later merge with Studie, bringing Taku Bamba to the team as well.
Chevrolet cars, which previously appeared in Super GT in the 2007 season also returned to the series, with Tomei Sports replacing their 996 type Porsche 911 GT3 with a Corvette Z06-R.
Porsche supplied two new 2010 specification Porsche 911 GT3Rs to Direction Racing and Team Art Taste, the latter team, which was a regular entrant of Super Taikyu series, also marked their debut season in Super GT. The 2010 specification Porsche 911 GT3R which was used by Team COX last season was given to the Hankook KTR team.
Team SG Changi, which uses a Lexus IS350 with former RE Amemiya driver Ryo Orime and Alexandre Imperatori is participating in the series for the first time.
Kazuki Hoshino, the driver's Champion of GT300 last year, moved from Hasemi Motorsport to A Speed (using an Aston Martin V8 Vantage GT2), replacing Hideshi Matsuda. Hasemi Motorsport was later to announce their withdrawal from the series.

Calendar

Notes:
 – Race stopped early due to bad weather, full points awarded.
 – The Okayama round was still considered Round 1.
 – Race stopped early due to energy curfew, full points awarded.

Standings

GT500 Drivers
Scoring system

GT300 Drivers
Scoring system

References

External links
 Super GT official website 

2010
Super GT